The UCI Cyclo-cross World Cup is a season-long competition in cyclo-cross, organised by the Union Cycliste Internationale (UCI). First held in the 1993–1994 season, there are currently five awards, tailored to the different categories of riders: Men Elite, Women Elite, Men Under 23, Women Under 23, and Men Junior.

The World Cup is not to be confused with the World Championship, also organised by the UCI, which is a single one day race that awards the winner with a rainbow jersey to be worn in every race till the next World Championship. Typically the World Championships are held a week or two after the end of the World Cup at the end of January or early February.

In November 2014 the first round of the World Cup ever to take place outside mainland Europe was held in Milton Keynes, England. The following September, the CrossVegas competition was incorporated into the World Cup for the first time, becoming the first World Cup round to be held in the United States.

Overall series winners

Men

|-
|2007–08
| style="text-align: left;" |
|Not awarded for individuals
|

 

 

Winners:  :20 -  :6 -  :2

Women

|-
|2007–08
| style="text-align: left;" |
|Not awarded for individuals
|

 

 
 

Winner :  :10 -:3 -  :2 -  :2 -

Under-23 Men

Winners :  :5 -:5 -  :3 -  :1 -  :1

Winners

Races

 WC = The course held the UCI Cyclo-cross World Championships in that season
 Xw = Race cancelled due to bad weather
 Xp = Race cancelled due to COVID-19 pandemic

References

External links
Official site and archives

 
Cyclo-cross World Cup
Cyclo-cross races